3915 Fukushima, provisional designation , is a carbonaceous asteroid from the inner regions of the asteroid belt, approximately 21 kilometers in diameter.

It was discovered on 15 August 1988, by Japanese astronomers Masayuki Yanai and Kazuro Watanabe at the Kitami Observatory in eastern Hokkaido, Japan, and named after amateur astronomer Hisao Fukushima.

Orbit and classification 

Fukushima orbits the Sun in the inner main-belt at a distance of 2.3–2.5 AU once every 3 years and 10 months (1,392 days). Its orbit has an eccentricity of 0.04 and an inclination of 14° with respect to the ecliptic.

Physical characteristics 

Fukushima has been characterized as a reddish P-type asteroid by the NEOWISE mission of NASA's Wide-field Infrared Survey Explorer. It is also an assumed C-type asteroid.

Rotation period 

Several high-quality rotational lightcurves were obtained from photometric observations since 2003. An observation by Brian D. Warner at the U.S. Palmer Divide Observatory in Colorado rendered a rotation period of  hours with a high brightness variation of 0.67 in magnitude, indicating that the body has a non-spherical shape. In 2011, an observation by René Roy gave another concurring period of  hours and an amplitude of 0.79 mag. On 16 December 2012, the asteroid occulted the star HIP 4315 over parts of Europe and North America. At the time the body's brightness was 16.3 in magnitude (mag) and that of the star was 8.5 mag.

Diameter and albedo 

According to the space-based surveys carried out by the Infrared Astronomical Satellite IRAS, the Japanese Akari satellite, and the NEOWISE mission, the asteroid has a low albedo in the range of 0.044 and 0.056 with a diameter between 20.3 and 22.8 kilometers. The Collaborative Asteroid Lightcurve Link gives preference to the results obtained by IRAS with an albedo of 0.0561 and a diameter of 20.38 kilometers.

Naming 

This minor planet was named in honor of Japanese researcher and amateur astronomer, Hisao Fukushima (1910–1997), known for his research in hydrodynamics. He was professor emeritus at Hokkaido University, and, as an active amateur astronomer, a member of the Hokkaido Astronomical Liaison Group. The approved naming citation was published by the Minor Planet Center on 23 December 1988.

References

External links 
 Lightcurve plot of 3915 Fukushima, Palmer Divide Observatory, B. D. Warner (2003)
 Asteroid Lightcurve Database (LCDB), query form (info )
 Dictionary of Minor Planet Names, Google books
 Asteroids and comets rotation curves, CdR – Observatoire de Genève, Raoul Behrend
 Discovery Circumstances: Numbered Minor Planets (1)-(5000) – Minor Planet Center
 
 

003915
Discoveries by Masayuki Yanai
Discoveries by Kazuro Watanabe
Named minor planets
003915
19880815